Cestica is a village and municipality in Croatia in Varaždin County.

According to the 2011 census, there are 5,806 inhabitants, in the following settlements:
 Babinec, population 575
 Brezje Dravsko, population 209
 Cestica, population 504
 Dubrava Križovljanska, population 267
 Falinić Breg, population 100
 Gornje Vratno, population 1.301
 Jarki, population 155
 Kolarovec, population 249
 Križanče, population 126
 Križovljan Radovečki, population 253
 Mali Lovrečan, population 65
 Malo Gradišće, population 124
 Natkrižovljan, population 291
 Otok Virje, population 251
 Radovec, population 336
 Radovec Polje, population 144
 Selci Križovljanski, population 184
 Veliki Lovrečan, population 337
 Virje Križovljansko, population 270
 Vratno Otok, population 65

The majority of the population are Croats.

References

External links
 

Municipalities of Croatia
Populated places in Varaždin County